"Shut Up Chicken" is a song by El Capon, released as a single on 10 January 2020 by Jo&Co. "Shut Up Chicken" was written by Basshunter, Claydee, Thomas Jules and Ilkay Sencan. It was written during a writing session of the PowerHouse label in Dubai.

A music video for "Shut Up Chicken" was directed by Fabrice Begotti and was published on El Capon channel on 10 January 2020. "Shut Up Chicken" received support from David Guetta, Lost Frequencies, Hardwell and other artists. El Capon performed song during the Les Douze Coups de midi and La Chanson de l'année on TF1.

Track listing

Personnel

Credits
 Composer, lyricst – Basshunter, Claydee, Thomas Jules and Ilkay Sencan

Charts

Weekly charts

Year-end charts

References 

2020 songs
2020 singles
Songs written by Basshunter
Songs written by Claydee
Song recordings produced by Claydee